Agona Nkwanta is a town in Ghana. It is the capital of Ahanta West District.
Agona, also known as Agona Junction or just Agona, is 7 km inland and en route between Takoradi and Tarkwa, with a branch road off to Dixcove (and Achowa, Akwidaa) and Busua. According to the Ghana Statistical Service's 2010 Population and Housing Census, the population of Agona Nkwanta was 14,104.

The only Senior High school in Agona is Baidoo Bonsoe Senior High Technical School. Agona is one of the fasted growing towns in the Western Region according to studies .

Language spoken is Ahanta with many non-Ahanta speakers talking Fante or a mixture or the two, known locally as Fant-Ahanta.

References

Populated places in Ahanta West Municipal District